Rehoboth Urban West is an electoral constituency in the Hardap region of Namibia, comprising the suburbs of Rehoboth that are situated to the west of the national road B1. It had a population of 11,197 in 2011, up from 9,238 in 2001.   the constituency had 8,324 registered voters.

Politics
The 2020 regional election were won by Harald Kambrude of the Landless People's Movement (LPM, a new party registered in 2018). He obtained 1,237 votes. Francis Huish of the Popular Democratic Movement (PDM, the new name of the DTA) came second with 766 votes, followed by Karl Manfred Draghoender (SWAPO, 706 votes). The sitting councillor Christ ran as an independent candidate in 2020 but only obtained 94 votes.
The 2015 regional elections were won by Laurena Wilhelmina Christ of the United People's Movement (UPM) with 1,975 votes. No other constituency in Hardap Region was won by an opposition candidate. Previous councillor and Namibia's Deputy Minister of Lands and Resettlement Theo Diergaardt of the ruling SWAPO party came second with 1,479 votes, followed by Marthinus Christiaan Kotze of the Democratic Turnhalle Alliance (DTA, 159 votes).

References 

Constituencies of Hardap Region
Rehoboth, Namibia
States and territories established in 1992
1992 establishments in Namibia